Vestland is a county in Norway established on 1 January 2020. The county is located in Western Norway and it is centred around the city of Bergen, Norway's second largest city. The administrative centre of the county is the city of Bergen, where the executive and political leadership is based, but the County Governor is based in Hermansverk. The county is one of two counties in Norway that have Nynorsk as their official written language form (the others are neutral as to which form people use).

Vestland was created in 2020 when the former counties of Hordaland and Sogn og Fjordane (with the exception of Hornindal municipality, which became part of Volda municipality in Møre og Romsdal county) were merged.

History
Vestland county is a newly created county, but it has been inhabited for centuries. The area was made up of many petty kingdoms under the Gulating during the Middle Ages. The northern part was the known as Firdafylke (now the Fjordane region; Nordfjord-Sunnfjord), the central are was known as Sygnafylke (now the Sogn region), and the southern part was known as Hordafylke. 

In the early 16th century, Norway was divided into four len. The Bergenhus len was headquartered in Bergen and encompassed much of western and northern Norway including Firdafylke, Sygnafylke, Hordafylke, and Sunnmørafylke (in the present day Møre og Romsdal county). The new Bergenhus len was administered from the Bergenhus Fortress in the city of Bergen.

In 1662, the lens were replaced by amts. On 19 February 1662, a royal decree changed the name to Bergenhus amt. The new Bergenhus amt originally consisted of the present-day areas of Vestland and the Sunnmøre region of Møre og Romsdal, plus the far northern Nordlandene amt was subordinate to Bergenhus amt. The Sunnmøre region was transferred to Romsdalen amt in 1689 and the Nordlandene amt was separated around that time as well.

In 1763, the amt was divided into northern and southern parts: Nordre Bergenhus amt and Søndre Bergenhus amt. When the amt was split, the present day municipality of Gulen was split with the southern part ending up in Søndre Bergenhus amt. In 1773, the border was re-drawn so that all of Gulen was located in the northern part. 

On 1 January 1919, Nordre Bergenhus amt was renamed Sogn og Fjordane fylke and Søndre Bergenhus amt was renamed Hordaland fylke during a period of time when many location names in Norway were changed.

The city of Bergen was removed from the Bergenhus amt in 1831 and it was classified as a city-county (byamt) from 1831 to 1972. During that time in 1915, the municipality of Årstad was annexed into Bergen. In 1972, the neighbouring municipalities of Arna, Fana, Laksevåg and Åsane were annexed into the city of Bergen. Also at that same time, the city of Bergen lost its county status, and became a part of Hordaland county once again.

On 1 January 2020, Hordaland and Sogn og Fjordane counties were merged back together once again, forming Vestland county.

Geography

Vestland is located on the western coast of Norway. It is split up by several long, deep fjords including the Nordfjorden, Sognefjorden, and Hardangerfjorden, some of Norway's most notable fjords and great tourist attractions. About half of the Hardangervidda National Park is in the county. It also includes the Jostedal, Folgefonna, and Hardangerjøkulen glaciers. The county also includes many well-known waterfalls, such as Vøringsfossen and Stykkjedalsfossen. Both are located in the Jotunheim mountains.

Outside of the Bergen metropolitan area, the county is mostly a rural area with a scattered population. Cruise ships visit Vestland all summer because of the unique vistas of high mountains and deep blue fjords. The famous Nærøyfjord is located in the south of the county. This is a UNESCO listed fjord area. There are several archipelagos, including Øygarden, Austevoll, Bulandet, Bremangerlandet, and Kinn. The westernmost point in Norway proper is Holmebåen in Solund municipality.

Because of the steep rise in elevation and fjords cutting through the terrain, the amount of precipitation is very high. Low pressure systems come in from the west and meet the mountains (a phenomenon known as orographic lifting) and cause rain and snowfall.

Government

A county (fylke) is the chief local administrative area in Norway. The whole country is divided into 11 counties. A county is also an election area, with popular votes taking place every 4 years. In Vestland, the government of the county is the Vestland County Municipality. It includes 65 members who are elected to form a county council (Fylkesting). Heading the Fylkesting is the county mayor (fylkesordførar). Since 2020, the Vestland County Municipality has been led by Jon Askeland, the county mayor.

The county also has a County Governor (fylkesmann) who is the representative of the King and Government of Norway. Lars Sponheim is the current County Governor of Vestland and this office is based in Hermansverk.

The municipalities in Vestland are divided among several district courts (tingrett): Nordhordland District Court, Sunnhordland District Court, Bergen District Court, Hardanger District Court, and Sogn og Fjordane District Court. All of these courts are subordinate to the Gulating Court of Appeal district based in Bergen.

Media gallery

Municipalities
Vestland County has a total of 43 municipalities:

See also
List of villages in Vestland
List of churches in Bjørgvin
Søråsen

References

 
Counties of Norway
2020 establishments in Norway
States and territories established in 2020